Bernardo Tobar Prado (born 14 December 1977) is a Colombian sports shooter. He competed in the men's 25 metre rapid fire pistol event at the 2020 Summer Olympics.

References

External links
 

1977 births
Living people
Colombian male sport shooters
Olympic shooters of Colombia
Shooters at the 2020 Summer Olympics
People from Popayán
Sportspeople from Cauca Department
21st-century Colombian people
Competitors at the 2010 South American Games
South American Games bronze medalists for Colombia
South American Games medalists in shooting